Dance Dance Revolution: Mario Mix, known in Europe as Dancing Stage Mario Mix, is a 2005 music video game developed by Konami and Hudson Soft and published by Nintendo for the GameCube. It is the first Dance Dance Revolution game to be released on a Nintendo video game console outside Japan.

Dance Dance Revolution: Mario Mix predominantly features characters, music, and locations from the Mario franchise. The game was bundled with the dance pad controller.

Gameplay

Dance Dance Revolution: Mario Mix runs on a modified version of the Mario Party 6 engine, and follows the gameplay formula established in all prior Dance Dance Revolution games. The game features several gameplay modes: Story Mode takes the player through a linear progression of tracks, framed as a story of Mario and Luigi traveling the Mushroom Kingdom to retrieve the missing Music Keys. Once a track has been cleared in Story Mode, it becomes available for play in Free Mode, which allows up to two players to dance simultaneously. The player can purchase items at Lakitu's shop during Story Mode that can be used to assist them if they are struggling. Some stages feature "Mush Mode" rules, which replace the traditional arrows with Mario enemies that feature unique mechanics. Special minigames will also appear during Story Mode, providing alternate gameplay styles such as jumping up on a flagpole or hitting Goombas that emerge from pipes with a hammer. Like the tracks, these mini-games will be unlocked for free play in Mini-Game Mode once they have been cleared in Story Mode. Once the player completes Story Mode for the first time, they will unlock Story Mode EX, which features a slightly altered selection of songs. Additional difficulty levels can also be unlocked.

Plot
The game opens with Waluigi stealing the four Music Keys, which can grant wishes, from Truffle Towers. However, when he tries to open the door to the room containing the Music Keys, three of them scatter across the Mushroom Kingdom, leaving him with only one key. From a distance, Toad watches these events unfold and rushes to tell Mario or Luigi, depending on which character the player chose, who then rushes off to retrieve the missing Music Keys.

The keys are recovered by completing tasks for other characters who have found the scattered keys and then defeating them in a dance challenge. These characters are, in order, Waluigi, Pirate Lakitu, Big Blooper, Hammer Bros., Wario and Freezie. After recovering each key, Toad and the player's character sail the SS Brass, an instrument-themed airship, and head to new world unless all Music Keys are recovered/collected.

After collecting the four Music Keys, Toad and the player's character then return the Music Keys to Truffle Towers. Soon after, Bowser steals the keys, but is followed by Toad and the player's chosen character. They infiltrate Bowser's Castle to recapture the Music Keys while being attacked by Bill Blasters and their Bullet Bills, and are promptly challenged by Bowser. After defeating him in a dance-off, Bowser tells Toad and the player's character that he planned to use the Music Keys to fix his tone deafness. This prompts the player's character to use the Music Keys to turn the area around Bowser's Castle into a green field and induces a feeling to dance in everyone, with Toad realizing that this was how the Music Keys were supposed to be used as the game's ending sequence plays.

Music
Dance Dance Revolution: Mario Mix features 29 music tracks, including remixes of both tracks from previous Mario titles and public domain classical music. Only one track is initially available, while the remainder are unlocked by clearing them in Story Mode and Story Mode EX, or by purchasing them from Lakitu's shop. The following table lists the tracks in the order they appear in Free Play.

*Replaces the previous song in Story Mode EX.

Reception

Dance Dance Revolution: Mario Mix received mixed reviews, gaining aggregate critical scores of 71.70% and 69% on GameRankings and Metacritic.

Notes

References

External links
Dance Dance Revolution: Mario Mix at Nintendo.com (archives of the original at the Internet Archive). Accessed on 2005-05-20.
Dance Dance Revolution Mario Mix on Mobygames

2005 video games
Dance Dance Revolution games
Konami games
GameCube-only games
GameCube games
Single-player video games
Hudson Soft games
Nintendo games
Mario spin-off games
Crossover video games
Video games developed in Japan